Transport in North Korea is constrained by economic problems and government restrictions. Public transport predominates, and most of it is electrified.

Restrictions on freedom of movement
Travel to North Korea is tightly controlled. The standard route to and from North Korea is by plane or train via Beijing. Transport directly to and from South Korea was possible on a limited scale from 2003 until 2008, when a road was opened (bus tours, no private cars). Freedom of movement in North Korea is also limited, as citizens are not allowed to move around freely inside their country. On October 14, 2018, North and South Korea agreed to restore inter-Korean rail and road transportation. On November 22, 2018, North and South Korea reopened a road on the Korean border which had been closed since 2004. On November 30, 2018, inter-Korean rail transportation resumed when a South Korean train crossed into North Korea for the first time since November 2008. On December 8, 2018, a South Korean bus crossed into North Korea.

Roads

Fuel constraints and the near absence of private automobiles have relegated road transportation to a secondary role. However, The World Factbook (published by the US Central Intelligence Agency) lists  of roads with only  paved as of 2006.

There are three major multilane highways in North Korea: the Pyongyang–Wonsan Tourist Motorway, a  expressway connecting Pyongyang and Wonsan on the east coast, the Youth Hero Motorway, a  expressway connecting Pyongyang and its port, Nampo, and the Pyongyang-Kaesong Motorway, a four-lane  motorway linking Pyongyang and Kaesong. The overwhelming majority of the estimated 264,000 vehicles in use in 1990 were for the military. Rural bus service connects all villages, and all major cities have bus and tram services. Since 1945/1946, there is right-hand traffic on roads. In cities, driving speeds are set by which lane a driver is in. A white-on-blue sign informs about this. The leftmost lane, if it is number 3 from the right or higher and is not a turning lane, is often left vacant, even by tourist buses, while the second-from-right lane is generally used to overtake vehicles from lane one, such as public transport buses and trams.

Besides the blue in-city sign, all other occasions, such as motorways and roads outside cities, use the more widely known red-circle-with-number-inside sign to post speed limits. The rightmost lane of a motorway is sometimes, as seen on the Pyongyang–Myohyang highway, limited to  near on-ramp joining points.

Automobile transportation is further restricted by a series of regulations. According to North Korean exile Kim Ji-ho, unless a civilian driver receives a special permit, it is forbidden to drive alone (the driver must carry passengers). Other civilian permits are a military mobilization permit (to transport soldiers in times of war), a certificate of driver training (to be renewed every year), a fuel validity document (a certificate confirming that the fuel was purchased from an authorized source), and a mechanical certificate (to prove that the car is in working order).

Since about 2014, horizontally-mounted traffic lights and cameras have been installed in central Pyongyang and other cities. Outside Pyongyang, roundabouts are often used on busy junctions.

As of 2017, electric bicycles are becoming popular in Pyongyang; about 5% of bicycles are electric. Both locally produced and Chinese electric bicycles were available.

Public transport

There is a mix of locally built and imported trolleybuses and trams in the major urban centres of North Korea. Earlier fleets were obtained from Europe and China.

For the list of trolleybus systems in North Korea, see this list.

Other forms of public transport include a commuters' narrow gauge railway from Hamhung to Hungnam which links to the 2.8 Vinylon Complex.

North Korea also has regularly scheduled motorcoach service connecting major cities and nearby towns to one another, which can be identified by their destination signs. For example Pyongyang-Sariwon, or Pyongyang-Wonsan. Some bus lines supplement the electric transportation in Pyongyang, as seen in a 1989 map that was likely obtained during the 13th World Festival of Youth and Students.

Some routes are still identifiable, such as the route 10, which now has a destination of Sadong-Daedongmun, and has its own stop on Okryu street. Some parts have changed much more drastically, like the southwest of Pyongyang, which has seen a lot of new construction. One thing that makes tracing the routes difficult is that all kinds of transportation vehicles in North Korea rarely show a route number, opting for a destination sign instead. Some buses may be used for non-regularly scheduled service, but are indistinguishable because all the buses are state owned and can be used for a variety of purposes.

Railways

The Korean State Railway is the only rail operator in North Korea. The narrow gauge segment runs in the Haeju peninsula.

Because of lack of maintenance on the rail infrastructure and vehicles, the travel time by rail is increasing. It has been reported that the  trip from Pyongyang to Kaesong can take up to six hours.

Water transport

Water transport on the major rivers and along the coasts plays a growing role in freight and passenger traffic. Except for the Yalu and Taedong rivers, most of the inland waterways, totaling , are navigable only by small boats. Coastal traffic is heaviest on the eastern seaboard, whose deeper waters can accommodate larger vessels. The major ports are Nampo on the west coast and Rajin, Chongjin, Wonsan, and Hamhung on the east coast. The country's harbor loading capacity in the 1990s was estimated at almost 35 million tons a year. There is a continuing investment in upgrading and expanding port facilities, developing transportation—particularly on the Taedong River—and increasing the share of international cargo by domestic vessels.

List of ports in North Korea
Chongjin
Haeju
Hamhung
Kimchaek
Kaesong
Nampo
Rasŏn
Sinuiju
Sonbong (formerly Unggi)
Songnim
Ungsang
Wonsan

Merchant marine

In the early 1990s, North Korea possessed an oceangoing merchant fleet, largely domestically produced, of 68 ships (of at least 1,000 gross-registered tons), totalling 465,801 gross-registered tons, which included 58 cargo ships and two tankers. As of 2008, this has increased to a total of 167 vessels consisting mainly of cargo and tanker ships.

Ferry Service
North Korea maintains the Man Gyong Bong 92, a ferry connecting Rajin and Vladivostok, Russia.

Air transport

North Korea's international air connections are limited in frequency and numbers.  As of 2011, scheduled flights operate only from Pyongyang's Pyongyang Sunan International Airport to Beijing, Dalian, Shenyang, Shanghai, Bangkok, Kuala Lumpur, Singapore, Moscow, Khabarovsk, Vladivostok, and Kuwait International Airport.  Charters to other destinations operate as per demand. Prior to 1995, many routes to Eastern Europe were operated including services to Sofia, Belgrade, Prague, and Budapest, along with others.

Air Koryo is the country's national airline. , Air China also operates flights between Beijing and Pyongyang. In 2013, MIAT Mongolian Airlines began operating direct charter services from Ulaanbattar to Pyongyang with Boeing 737-800 aircraft.

Internal flights are available between Pyongyang, Hamhung, Haeju (HAE), Hungnam (HGM), Kaesong (KSN), Kanggye, Kilju, Najin (NJN), Nampo (NAM), Sinuiju (SII), Samjiyon, Wonsan (WON), Songjin (SON), and Chongjin (CHO). All civil aircraft are operated by Air Koryo, which has a fleet of 19 passenger and cargo aircraft, all of which are Soviet or more modern Russian types.

As of 2013, the CIA estimates that North Korea has 82 usable airports, 39 of which have permanent-surface runways.

It was reported that North Korean air traffic controllers had been cut off from the international global satellite communications network in 2017 because North Korea had not made the required payments. Traffic controllers at Pyongyang Sunan International Airport had to use conventional telephone lines to inform their counterparts at Incheon International Airport that the flight containing North Korean delegates to the 2018 Winter Olympic Games in South Korea had taken off.

Vehicle markings

Road vehicles in North Korea bear distance stars.  These are paint markings which display how far the particular vehicle has traveled without incident. Each star represents  travelled without an accident.

The DPRK license plate background color denotes the vehicle type;

 Blue - Government issued vehicle
 Black - Military vehicle
 Yellow - Private vehicle - permitted persons who have contributed greatly to DPRK
 Green -Diplomatic
 Red - Non-governmental Organizations (NGO)

See also
 Tourism in North Korea
 Urban planning in communist countries

References

Further reading
 Download a map of the entire North Korean Railway system to Google Earth here. 
 Ducruet, Cesar et Jo, Jin-Cheol (2008) Coastal Cities, Port Activities and Logistic Constraints in a Socialist Developing Country: The Case of North Korea, Transport Reviews, Vol. 28, No. 1, pp. 1–25
 Jo, Jin-Cheol et Ducruet, Cesar (2007) Rajin-Seonbong, new gateway of Northeast Asia, Annals of Regional Science, Vol. 41, No. 4, pp. 927–950
 Jo, Jin-Cheol et Ducruet, Cesar (2006) Maritime trade and port evolution in a socialist developing country : Nampo, gateway of North Korea, The Korea Spatial Planning Review, Vol. 51, pp. 3–24: https://web.archive.org/web/20110722141923/http://library.krihs.re.kr/file/publication/att_file/publication2/PR51_01.pdf
 DUCRUET, Cesar, JO, Jin-Cheol, LEE, Sung-Woo, ROUSSIN, Stanislas, 2008, Geopolitics of shipping networks: the case of North Korea's maritime connections, Sustainability in International Shipping, Port and Logistics Industries and the China Factor, International Association of Maritime Economists (IAME), Dalian, China, April 2–4.
 DUCRUET, Cesar, ROUSSIN, Stanislas, 2007, The changing relations between hinterland and foreland at North Korean ports (1985–2006), 6th Inha & Le Havre International Conference, Inha University, Incheon, Republic of Korea, October 10–11.
 DUCRUET, Cesar, ROUSSIN, Stanislas, 2007, Inter-Korean maritime linkages: economic integration vs. hub dependence, 15th European Conference on Theoretical and Quantitative Geography, Montreux, Switzerland, September 7–11, pp. 133–139 .
 ROUSSIN, Stanislas, DUCRUET, Cesar, 2007, The Nampo-Pyongyang corridor: a strategic area for European investment in DPRK, Recent Changes in North Korea and the Role of the European Union, Institute of Unification Studies & Hans Seidel Foundation, Seoul National University, Seoul, Republic of Korea, June 1.
 ROUSSIN, Stanislas, DUCRUET, Cesar, 2007, Doing business in DPRK for the European companies: the logistic issue, Seogang University, Seoul, Republic of Korea, May 26.
 ROUSSIN, Stanislas, DUCRUET, Cesar, 2006, Logistic perspectives in DPRK, Annual Fall Meeting of the Korean Society of Coastal and Ocean Engineers, Seoul, Republic of Korea, September 15–16.
 Ducruet, Cesar et Roussin, Stanislas (2007) Coree du Nord : vers l'ouverture des ports maritimes, Journal de la Marine Marchande, No. 4566, Juin 22, pp. 6–9.
 Ducruet, Cesar et Roussin, Stanislas (2007) L'archipel nord-coreen : transition economique et blocages territoriaux, Mappemonde, Vol. 87, http://mappemonde.mgm.fr/num15/articles/art07302.html

External links

 Air Koryo official website 
 Pyongyang metro unofficial website